was a Japanese daimyō of the Edo period.

Daimyo
Kyoto Shoshidai
1739 births
1801 deaths